"Edgar" Lau Shek Fai (born 2 April 1991) is a Hong Kong racing driver currently competing in the TCR International Series. Having previously competed in the Asian Le Mans Series Sprint Cup and Zhuhai Pan Delta Super Racing Festival amongst others.

Racing career
Lau began his career in 2014 in the 25 Hours of Thunderhill endurance race, and took part in the race two times in 2014 and 2015. Both times participating in the E3 class, winning the class in 2014. In 2015 he switched to the Zhuhai Pan Delta Super Racing Festival, taking two victories in 2015, he continued racing there in 2016 taking a single victory. He also raced in the Asian Le Mans Series Sprint Cup for 2016 season, taking a single victory on his way to finishing fifth in the championships LMP3 standings.

In November 2016 it was announced that he would race in the TCR International Series, driving a SEAT León TCR  for Asia Racing Team.

Racing record

Complete TCR International Series results
(key) (Races in bold indicate pole position) (Races in italics indicate fastest lap)

† Driver did not finish the race, but was classified as he completed over 90% of the race distance.

References

External links
 
 

Living people
TCR International Series drivers
Hong Kong racing drivers
1991 births
TCR Asia Series drivers
Asia Racing Team drivers
Le Mans Cup drivers